This is a list of species in the lichen genus Parmotrema. A 2016 estimate places about 300 species in the genus.

A

Parmotrema aberrans 
Parmotrema abessinicum 
Parmotrema abnuens 
Parmotrema acanthifolium 
Parmotrema acrotrychum 
Parmotrema acutatum 
Parmotrema adspersum 
Parmotrema afrocetratum  – Rwanda
Parmotrema albinatum 
Parmotrema aldabrense 
Parmotrema alectoronicum  – Brazil
Parmotrema alidactylatum  – Argentina
Parmotrema amaniense 
Parmotrema amboimense 
Parmotrema anchietanum  – Brazil
Parmotrema andinum 
Parmotrema appendiculatum 
Parmotrema applanatum  – Brazil
Parmotrema apricum 
Parmotrema aptrootii  – Guyana
Parmotrema araucariarum 
Parmotrema argentinum 
Parmotrema arnoldii 
Parmotrema arteagum  – Mexico
Parmotrema asperum  – Brazil
Parmotrema aurantiacoparvum  – Guyana
Parmotrema austrocetratum  – New Zealand
Parmotrema austromaculatum 
Parmotrema austrosinense 
Parmotrema awasthii  – India

B
Parmotrema balense 
Parmotrema bangii 
Parmotrema barioense 
Parmotrema betaniae  – Venezuela
Parmotrema bifidum 
Parmotrema blanchetianum 
Parmotrema bonplandii 
Parmotrema brasiliense  – Brazil

C

Parmotrema cachimboense  – Brazil
Parmotrema cactacearum 
Parmotrema catarinae  – Brazil
Parmotrema chiapense 
Parmotrema chinense 
Parmotrema clavuliferum 
Parmotrema clercianum 
Parmotrema ciliiferum  – Brazil
Parmotrema circinatum  – Australia
Parmotrema compositum 
Parmotrema concors 
Parmotrema concurrens  – Brazil
Parmotrema conferendum 
Parmotrema conformatum 
Parmotrema confusum  – Brazil
Parmotrema conidioarcuatum 
Parmotrema conjunctum 
Parmotrema consors 
Parmotrema convolutum 
Parmotrema cooperi 
Parmotrema coralliforme 
Parmotrema corniculans 
Parmotrema cornigerum 
Parmotrema cornutum 
Parmotrema crassescens 
Parmotrema crinitoides 
Parmotrema crinitum 
Parmotrema cristatum 
Parmotrema cristiferum 
Parmotrema cristobalii 
Parmotrema crocoides 
Parmotrema cryptoxanthoides 
Parmotrema cryptoxanthum

D
Parmotrema dactylosum  – Brazil
Parmotrema defectum 
Parmotrema deflectens 
Parmotrema degelianum 
Parmotrema delicatulum 
Parmotrema demethylmicrophyllinicum 
Parmotrema despectum 
Parmotrema diacidulum 
Parmotrema dilatatum 
Parmotrema direagens 
Parmotrema disparile 
Parmotrema dissimile  – Brazil
Parmotrema diversum 
Parmotrema dolosum 
Parmotrema dominicanum 
Parmotrema durumae

E
Parmotrema eborinum 
Parmotrema eciliatum 
Parmotrema eitenii  – Brazil
Parmotrema elacinulatum 
Parmotrema eliasaroanum  – Brazil
Parmotrema elixii 
Parmotrema endosulphureum 
Parmotrema enteroxanthum  – Venezuela
Parmotrema epileucum 
Parmotrema erasmium 
Parmotrema erectociliatum 
Parmotrema erhizinosum 
Parmotrema erubescens 
Parmotrema eunetum 
Parmotrema euplectinum 
Parmotrema eurysacum 
Parmotrema expansum  – Costa Rica
Parmotrema explanatum 
Parmotrema exquisitum

F
Parmotrema fasciculatum 
Parmotrema fistulatum 
Parmotrema flaccidifolium 
Parmotrema flavescens 
Parmotrema flavomedullosum 
Parmotrema flavotinctum 
Parmotrema fleigiae  – Brazil
Parmotrema foliolosum 
Parmotrema forsteri  – Australia
Parmotrema fractum 
Parmotrema fragilescens 
Parmotrema friabile  – Brazil
Parmotrema fumarprotocetraricum

G

Parmotrema gardneri 
Parmotrema gibberosum 
Parmotrema glaucocarpoides 
Parmotrema gloriosum 
Parmotrema gradsteinii  – Guyana
Parmotrema graniticum  – Brazil

Parmotrema granulare 
Parmotrema grayanum

H

Parmotrema hababianum 
Parmotrema haitiense 
Parmotrema hanningtonianum 
Parmotrema hawaiiensis 
Parmotrema hensseniae 
Parmotrema herrei 
Parmotrema hicksii  – Tanzania
Parmotrema hololobum 
Parmotrema homotomum 
Parmotrema horridum  – Brazil
Parmotrema hydrium 
Parmotrema hyperlaciniatulum  – Brazil
Parmotrema hypermaculatum – Brazil
Parmotrema hypoleucinum 
Parmotrema hypomiltoides 
Parmotrema hypotropum 
Parmotrema hypotrypum

I
Parmotrema immiscens 
Parmotrema incrassatum 
Parmotrema indicum  – India
Parmotrema inexspectatum 
Parmotrema insuetum 
Parmotrema internexum 
Parmotrema iringense 
Parmotrema isidioinsuetum

J
Parmotrema jacarandicola 
Parmotrema judithae

K
Parmotrema kahuziense 
Parmotrema kainantum 
Parmotrema kaisenikianum 
Parmotrema kamatii  – India
Parmotrema kwalense

L

Parmotrema laciniatulum 
Parmotrema laciniellum 
Parmotrema lacteum  – Brazil
Parmotrema laeve 
Parmotrema lambinonii 
Parmotrema lambleyi 
Parmotrema laongii 
Parmotrema larense 
Parmotrema latissimum 
Parmotrema lawreyi 
Parmotrema leonis 
Parmotrema lichexanthonicum 
Parmotrema lividotessellatum 
Parmotrema lobulascens 
Parmotrema lobulatum  – Brazil
Parmotrema lobuliferum 
Parmotrema lopezii  – Venezuela
Parmotrema lophogenum 
Parmotrema louisianae 
Parmotrema luminosum 
Parmotrema lyngeanum

M

Parmotrema machupicchuense 
Parmotrema maclayanum 
Parmotrema macrocarpum 
Parmotrema madagascariaceum 
Parmotrema madilynae  – Brazil
Parmotrema magnum 
Parmotrema mantiqueirense  – Brazil
Parmotrema maraense  – Brazil
Parmotrema marcellianum 

Parmotrema marcellii 
Parmotrema margaritatum 
Parmotrema masonii 
Parmotrema matudae 
Parmotrema maximum 
Parmotrema melanochaetum 
Parmotrema melanothrix 
Parmotrema mellissii 
Parmotrema menyamyaense  – Papua New Guinea
Parmotrema merrillii 
Parmotrema mesogenes 
Parmotrema mesotropum 
Parmotrema milanezii  – Brazil
Parmotrema mirandum 
Parmotrema mordenii 
Parmotrema moreliense 
Parmotrema muelleri 
Parmotrema myelochroum 
Parmotrema myriolobulatum

N
Parmotrema nanfongense 
Parmotrema naonii 
Parmotrema natalense 
Parmotrema negrosorientalum 
Parmotrema neocaledonicum 
Parmotrema neodiffractaicum 
Parmotrema neolobulascens 
Parmotrema neopustulatum 
Parmotrema neosticticum 
Parmotrema neosubcrinitum  – Brazil
Parmotrema neotropicum  – Southern United States; Cuba; Mexico
Parmotrema nilgherrense 
Parmotrema norsticticatum 
Parmotrema nudum 
Parmotrema nylanderi

O
Parmotrema ochrocrinitum 
Parmotrema ochroglaucum 
Parmotrema ornatulum 
Parmotrema overeemii

P

Parmotrema pachydermum 
Parmotrema pacificum 
Parmotrema pancheri 
Parmotrema paracrinitum 
Parmotrema paraense  – Brazil
Parmotrema parahypotropum 
Parmotrema paramoreliense 
Parmotrema pardi 
Parmotrema paulense 
Parmotrema pectinatum  – Brazil
Parmotrema peralbidum 
Parmotrema perforatum 
Parmotrema perlatum 
Parmotrema permaculatum 
Parmotrema permutatum 
Parmotrema petropoliense 
Parmotrema pigmentiferum 
Parmotrema pigmentosum  – Brazil
Parmotrema pilosum 
Parmotrema planatilobatum 
Parmotrema platyphyllinum 
Parmotrema pontagrossense 
Parmotrema poolii 
Parmotrema praeinsuetum 
Parmotrema praeisidiosum  – Brazil
Parmotrema praesorediosum 
Parmotrema preperforatum 
Parmotrema procerum 
Parmotrema progenes  – Brazil; Peru; San Martin
Parmotrema protolobulatum  – Brazil
Parmotrema pseudeunetum 
Parmotrema pseudobreviciliatum  – Argentina
Parmotrema pseudocrinitum 
Parmotrema pseudoexquisitum 
Parmotrema pseudograyanum 
Parmotrema pseudonilgherrense 
Parmotrema pseudoreticulatum 
Parmotrema pseudotinctorum 
Parmotrema pustulatum  – New Caledonia
Parmotrema pustulotinctum 
Parmotrema pycnidiocarpum

Q
Parmotrema queenslandense  – Australia

R

Parmotrema radiatum 
Parmotrema ramescens 
Parmotrema rampoddense 
Parmotrema ramusculum 
Parmotrema ravum 
Parmotrema recipiendum 
Parmotrema reitzii  – Brazil; Venezuela
Parmotrema reparatum 
Parmotrema restingense  – Brazil
Parmotrema reterimulosum 
Parmotrema reticulatum 
Parmotrema rigidum 
Parmotrema rimulosum 
Parmotrema robustum 
Parmotrema rubifaciens 
Parmotrema rubromarginatum  – Thailand
Parmotrema ruminatum 
Parmotrema ruptum

S

Parmotrema saccatilobum 
Parmotrema sampaioi 
Parmotrema sanctae-candidae  – Brazil
Parmotrema sanctiangelii 
Parmotrema sarrameanum  – New Caledonia
Parmotrema saxoisidiatum 
Parmotrema schindleri  – Brazil
Parmotrema screminiae  – Brazil
Parmotrema setchellii 
Parmotrema sieberi 
Parmotrema sorediiferum  – Venezuela
Parmotrema soredioaliphaticum  – Argentina
Parmotrema sorediosulphuratum  – Brazil
Parmotrema soyauxii 
Parmotrema spilotum 
Parmotrema spinibarbe 
Parmotrema stenopteris 
Parmotrema sticticum 
Parmotrema stuhlmannii 
Parmotrema stuppeum 
Parmotrema subarnoldii 
Parmotrema subcaperatum 
Parmotrema subcoloratum 
Parmotrema subcompositum  – Africa
Parmotrema subcorallinum 
Parmotrema subhanningtonianum 
Parmotrema subisidiosum 
Parmotrema sublatifolium 
Parmotrema submarginale 
Parmotrema submoreliense 
Parmotrema subochraceum  – Brazil
Parmotrema subpallescens 
Parmotrema subrigidum 
Parmotrema subrugatum 
Parmotrema subschimperi 
Parmotrema subsumptum 
Parmotrema subthomsonii 
Parmotrema subtropicum 
Parmotrema succinreticulatum 
Parmotrema sulphuratum 
Parmotrema superaguiense  – Brazil

T

Parmotrema taitae 
Parmotrema tandilense 
Parmotrema thailandicum  – Thailand
Parmotrema thomsonii 
Parmotrema tinctorum 
Parmotrema tongaense  – Tonga
Parmotrema tsavoënse

U
Parmotrema uberrimum 
Parmotrema ultralucens 
Parmotrema umbrosum 
Parmotrema upretii  – India
Parmotrema uruguense

V
Parmotrema vartakii  – India
Parmotrema ventanicum 
Parmotrema verrucisetosum  – Guyana
Parmotrema virescens  – Venezuela
Parmotrema viridiflavum 
Parmotrema vividum

W

Parmotrema wainii 
Parmotrema warmingii 
Parmotrema weberi 
Parmotrema wirthii  – Brazil
Parmotrema wrightii  – Brazil

X
Parmotrema xanthinum 
Parmotrema xanthopustulatum

Y
Parmotrema yodae 
Parmotrema yunnanum

Z
Parmotrema zicoi  – Brazil
Parmotrema zimbabwense 
Parmotrema zollingeri

References

Parmotrema